The 2018 Faroe Islands Premier League (also known as Betri deildin menn for sponsorship reasons) was the 76th season of top-tier football in the Faroe Islands. Víkingur Gøta were the defending champions, having won their second Faroese title in the previous season. The season started in 11 March and ended on 27 October.

Teams

The champions of the 2017 1. deild, AB Argir will be replacing ÍF who ended up last in the 2017 Faroe Islands Premier League.

Source: Scoresway

League table

Positions by round

Results
Each team plays three times (either twice at home and once away or once at home and twice away) against every other team for a total of 27 matches each.

Regular home games

Additional home games

Top goalscorers

References

Faroe Islands Premier League seasons
1
Faroe
Faroe